Carl Heinrich Reutti (1830 Villingen, Baden- 1895 Karlsruhe) was a German entomologist who specialised in Lepidoptera . He wrote (1853) Lepidopteren-Fauna Badens.Beiträge zur Rheinischen Naturgeschichte 3_3: 1-216 pdf in which he described Epichnopterix sieboldii. Other works are
(1895) Über die Hypenodes-Arten Entomologische Zeitung Stettin 56: 209-212.pdf
 (1889): Lepidopteren-Fauna des Grossherzogthums Baden - Schluss  Entomologische Zeitschrift 3: 117.pdf

References
Gaedike, R.; Groll, E. K. & Taeger, A. 2012: Bibliography of the entomological literature from the beginning until 1863 : online database – version 1.0 – Senckenberg Deutsches Entomologisches Institut.
Groll, E. K. 2017: Biographies of the Entomologists of the World. – Online database, version 8, Senckenberg Deutsches Entomologisches Institut, Müncheberg – URL: sdei.senckenberg.de/biografies
Anonym 1895: [Reutti, C.] Leopoldina 31, pp. 58
Guth, F. 1925: [Reutti, C.] Mitteilungen der Badischen Entomologischen Vereinigung Freiburg i. Br., Freiburg i. Br. 1,  10580, pp. 193–196

German lepidopterists
1895 deaths
1830 births